The information regarding List of rivers in the Araucanía Region on this page has been compiled from the data supplied by GeoNames. It includes all features named "Rio", "Canal", "Arroyo", "Estero" and those Feature Code is associated with a stream of water. This list contains 662 water streams.

Content
This list contains:
 Name of the stream, in Spanish Language
 Coordinates are latitude and longitude of the feature in ± decimal degrees, at the mouth of the stream
 Link to a map including the Geonameid (a number which uniquely identifies a Geoname feature)
 Feature Code explained in 
 Other names for the same feature, if any
 Basin countries additional to Chile, if any

List

(Some rivers flow in 2 regions, e.g. Araucania and Bío Bío Regions, like Tirúa, Lleulleu and others. Bío-Bío River, flows in the Bío-Bío Region, but some tributaries flows also in the Araucania Region. For overview we repeat here the complete Bío-Bío Drainage system, and the simple rivers that cross the regions)
 Rio TiruaRío Tirúa3869760STM (Araucania)
  Rio LleulleuRío Lleulleu3882908STM (Araucania)
 Rio BiobioRío Biobío3898379STM(Rio Biobio, Río Biobío)
  Estero Quilacoya3874265STM
 Rio LajaRío Laja3885501STM(Rio Laja, Rio de La Laja, Río Laja, Río de La Laja)
  Rio ClaroRío Claro3894566STM
  Rio RucueRío Rucúe3872723STM
  Rio PolcuraRío Polcura3875526STM
 Rio ReleRío Rele3873516STM
  Rio HuaquiRío Huaqui3887767STM(Rio Guaque, Rio Guaqui, Rio Huaqui, Río Guaque, Río Guaqui, Río Huaqui)
  Rio RarincoRío Rarinco3873687STM
 Tavolevo River
  Rio CulencoRío Culenco3893050STM
 Rio NicodahueRío Nicodahue3878688STM (Araucania)
 Rio La EsperanzaRío La Esperanza3885996STM (Araucania)
 Estero Maitenrehue3880915STM(Arroyo Maitenrehue, Estero Maitenrehue) (Araucania)
 Rio VergaraRío Vergara3868385STM (Araucania)
 Rio RenaicoRío Renaico3873457STM
  Rio MinincoRío Mininco3879769STM
  Rio MallecoRío Malleco3880840STM(Rio Malleco, Río Malleco) (Araucania)
  Rio HuequenRío Huequén3887625STM(Rio Hueque, Rio Huequen, Río Hueque, Río Huequén) (Araucania)
  Rio RahueRío Rahue3873851STM (Araucania)
  Rio PicoiquenRío Picoiquén3876204STM (Araucania)
  Rio BureoRío Bureo3897711STM
  Rio MulchenRío Mulchén3879199STM
  Rio DuquecoRío Duqueco3892136STM
  Estero LirquenEstero Lirquén3965538STM
 Queuco River
  Rio LonquimayRío Lonquimay3882532STM(Rio Lonquimai, Rio Lonquimay, Río Lonquimai, Río Lonquimay) (Araucania)
—List of rivers--

 Estero del Salto3872508STM(Estero El Salto, Estero del Salto)
 Estero PuaEstero Púa3875121STM
 Estero Rucaco3872747STM
 Estero Quilaco3874268STM
 Estero RehuecoyanEstero Rehuecoyán3873539STM(Estero Coyan, Estero Coyán, Estero Rehuecoyan, Estero Rehuecoyán)
 Rio PerquencoRío Perquenco3876479STM(Estero Perquenco, Rio Perquenco, Río Perquenco)
 Estero Ruca Pehuen3872737STM
 Estero Guamaqui3888512STM
 Arroyo Palo Santo3877534STM(Arroyo Palo Santo, Estero Palo Santo)
 Rio CaptrenRío Captrén3896823STM(Estero Catren, Rio Captren, Rio Catren, Río Captrén, Río Catrén)
 Rio RepucuraRío Repucura3873421STM
 Arroyo Coiparahue3860906STM(Arroyo Coiparahue)(AR, CL)
 Rio BoroaRío Boroa3898023STM
 Estero Guindos3888257STM
 Estero Putros3874544STM
 Rio ChuenganeRío Chuengane3894767STM
 Estero ChanleufuEstero Chanleufú3895457STM
 Estero QuillenEstero Quillén3874131STM

  Estero de los Pantanos3877292STM
  Estero de las Minas3879814STM
  Estero Quicho3874295STM
  Estero de los Pantanos3877293STM
  Estero Pino Hueco3875906STM
  Estero Palo Botado3877567STM(Arroyo Palo Botado, Estero Palo Botado)
  Estero del Molino3879596STM
  Estero El Pangal3890841STM
  Estero Recinto3873637STM
  Estero del Tijeral3869854STM
  Estero Itraque3887021STM
  Estero Quinahueco3874055STM
  Estero de Pellomenco3876749STM
  Rio MinincoRío Mininco3879767STM
  Estero de las Minas3879813STM
  Estero CoicoimallinEstero Coicoimallín3894428STM(Estero Coicoimallin, Estero Coicoimallín, Estero Coicomallin, Estero Coicomallín)
  Rio RehueRío Rehue3873540STM
  Estero de Loanco3882808STM(Estero de Loanco, Estero de Lonco)
  Estero Los Lleulles3881913STM
  Estero Cancura3896974STM
  Estero NipacoEstero Ñipaco3878617STM(Estero Nipaco, Estero Nitaco, Estero Ñipaco)
  Estero Deuco3892546STM
  Estero de las NinasEstero de las Niñas3878632STM
  Estero Lolenco3882660STM
  Estero Pichilolenco3876244STM
  Estero Troncura3869044STM
  Estero El Mulo3890921STM
  Estero Mininco3879770STM
  Estero RenicoEstero Reñico3873438STM(Estero Penico, Estero Peñico, Estero Renico, Estero Reñico)
  Estero Chacahue3895791STM
  Estero Enulhueco3890027STM(Estero Emulhueco, Estero Enulhueco)
  Estero NancoEstero Ñanco3879055STM
  Rio NancoRío Ñanco3879050STM(Estero Manco, Estero Nanco, Estero Ñanco, Rio Nanco, Río Ñanco)
  Estero Rahuelanco3873849STM
  Rio RequenRío Requen3873418STM
  Estero Curaco3892927STM
  Estero Calcaco3897328STM
  Estero Pemulemu3876726STM
  Estero Queuque3874309STM
  Estero PichicallinEstero Pichicallín3876304STM
  Estero Arquen3899319STM
  Estero CahuentueEstero Cahuentué3897443STM
  Estero Curihueque3892867STM
  Estero LuanrelunEstero Luanrelún3881231STM(Estero Luanrelun, Estero Luanrelún, Quebrada La Bruja)
  Estero Raqui3873699STM
  Estero Pilihue3875998STM
  Estero Panqueco3877316STM
  Estero Lilipulli3883219STM
  Estero Bolleco3898120STM
  Estero Guadaba3888623STM
  Estero Quilanco3874247STM(Estero Ininco, Estero Quilanco)
  Estero Nupangui3878428STM
  Estero Cherquenco3895234STM(Estero Chequenco, Estero Chequénco, Estero Cherquenco)
  Estero Pelehue3876780STM(Estero Napanir, Estero Naponir, Estero Pelehue)
  Estero Pidenco3876172STM
  Estero Vedaco3868552STM(Estero Pellehue, Estero Vedaco)(CL)
  Estero Pelahuenco3876808STM
  Estero Curanco3892896STM
  Estero de Moncol3879527STM(Estero de Moncol, Rio Moncol, Río Moncol)
  Rio CollochueRío Collochue3894173STM
  Estero Chicauco3895215STM
  Estero ChequenEstero Chequén3895241STM
  Estero Huentraico3887642STM
  Rio CatoRío Cato3896149STM
  Rio RalcoRío Ralco3873838STM
  Estero del Salto3872509STM(Estero El Salto, Estero del Salto)
  Rio QuileRío Quile3874225STM
  Estero GuallaliEstero Guallalí3888543STM
  Rio ChaquilvinRío Chaquilvin3895399STM(Rio Chaquillin, Rio Chaquilvin, Río Chaquillin, Río Chaquilvin)
  Estero La Mina3885329STM
  Estero Curanilahue3892890STM
  Estero Cullinco3893027STM
  Estero Polucos3875486STM
  Rio ChamichacoRío Chamichaco3895590STM
  Rio AmargosRío Amargos3899830STM
  Estero Curaco3892926STM
  Estero Tumarcuicui3868943STM
  Rio PichiamarRío Pichiamar3876309STM
  Estero Trecacura3869258STM
  Rio PailahuequeRío Pailahueque3877759STM
  Estero Lualahue3881234STM
  Estero del Catrimalal3896139STM
  Rio LominRío Lomín3882590STM
  Estero Chacaico3895786STM(Estero Chacaico, Estero Cullinco)
  Rio RenicoRío Reñico3873435STM
  Estero Ranquilco3873733STM
  Estero JordanEstero Jordán3886871STM
  Estero Lolohue3882656STM(Estero Lolahue, Estero Lolohue)
  Estero Panqueto3877306STM
  Estero CoipueEstero Coipué3894351STM
  Estero Coilaco3894381STM
  Rio RaquinRío Raquín3873696STM
  Estero Pichico3876294STM
  Estero Rallinco3873830STM
  Estero Rucacalquin3872748STM
  Estero QuetraltueEstero Quetraltué3874331STM
  Rio LolcoRío Lolco3882670STM(Estero Lolco, Quebrada El Volantin, Quebrada El Volantín, Rio Lolca, Rio Lolco, Rio Nolco, Río Lolca, Río Lolco, Río Nolco)
  Estero Bolleco3898119STM
  Estero Curavipi3892879STM
  Rio PelchueRío Pelchue3876796STM
  Estero Hueico3887723STM
  Estero Temumeo3870006STM
  Estero Lingue3883132STM
  Estero Rucanuco3872739STM
  Estero Pinilmapu3875912STM
  Estero Meco3880245STM
  Estero Toscas3869460STM
  Estero Pichi-CautinEstero Pichi-Cautín3876301STM
  Estero Piedras Rojas3876054STM
  Rio Pichi LumacoRío Pichi Lumaco3876242STM
  Estero Quilaco3874270STM
  Estero Esperanza3889839STM
  Estero Paso Malo3877084STM
  Rio NiblintoRío Niblinto3878692STM
  Rio LlanquenRío Llanquén3882959STM
  Estero Layenco3883483STM
  Estero Las Toscas3883849STM
  Estero Ronquillo3872850STM
  Estero RenicoEstero Reñico3873437STM
  Estero Pihun3876031STM
  Estero Remeco3873497STM
  Estero Chingue3895010STM
  Estero Colo3894160STM
  Estero Quilquilco3874081STM
  Rio RucauseyRío Rucausey3872725STM
  Rio DumoRío Dumo3892152STM
  Rio Pichi-MallecoRío Pichi-Malleco3876241STM
  Rio Las NalcasRío Las Nalcas3884140STM(Estero Nalca, Estero Naloa, Rio Las Nalcas, Río Las Nalcas)
  Estero Quilapan3874238STM
  Estero Cuncura3892969STM
  Estero Idaico3887376STM
  Estero del Tabaco3870403STM
  Estero Collahue3894218STM
  Estero de Los Temos3881338STM
  Estero de LancuEstero de Lancú3885248STM
  Estero Gualcutemu3888551STM
  Estero Epucheguin3890023STM(Estero Epucheguin, Quebrada Bellavista)
  Estero Mallenco3880839STM
  Estero Chanco3895487STM
  Estero Lehueluan3883433STM(Estero Lahuelan, Estero Lehueluan)
  Estero Liuque3883057STM(Estero Lauque, Estero Liuque, Estero Llanque)
  Estero Collipulli3894176STM
  Estero Conquehue3893736STM
  Estero Ancatraro3899732STM
  Rio RanquilRío Ránquil3873737STM
  Estero BonipenEstero Boñipen3898075STM
  Estero Llopinco3882838STM
  Estero Lumaquina3881169STM
  Rio PehuencoRío Pehuenco3876874STM
  Estero Pilenechico3876008STM
  Estero Sin Nombre3870837STM
  Rio RelunRío Relún3873502STM
  Estero Quilaco3874269STM
  Estero Curilebu3892862STM
  Estero Manzano3880613STM
  Estero Liucura3883062STM
  Estero Tricauco3869107STM
  Estero Banchuto3898859STM
  Estero Huillinlebu3887524STM
  Estero Treinta Ganchos3869247STM(Estero Ganchos, Estero Los Ganchos, Estero Treinta Ganchos)
  Estero Medahue3880241STM
  Estero NancoEstero Ñanco3879054STM
  Estero Tuco3868979STM
  Estero Soldado3870726STM
  Estero Llullun3882830STM
  Estero GuinaEstero Guiña3888263STM
  Estero Chanco3895486STM(Estero Chanco, Estero Coihueco)
  Estero Rillahueco3873301STM
  Estero Machihueco3881095STM
  Rio TraiguenRío Traiguén3869370STM
  Estero Ruca Ruca3872731STM
  Estero Lolenco3882659STM
  Estero Tahuao MallinEstero Tahuao Mallín3870337STM
  Estero Temulemu3870007STM
  Estero NirepuEstero Ñirepu3878601STM
  Estero de Las Tablas3883908STM
  Cajon ChicoCajón Chico3895199STM(Cajon Chico, Cajón Chico, Estero Cajon Chico)
  Cajon GrandeCajón Grande3888832STM(Cajon Grande, Cajón Grande, Estero Cajon Grande)
  Estero Coihueco3894396STM(Estero Coihueco, Estero Loihueco)
  Rio PululRío Pulul3874853STM
  Estero PercanEstero Percán3876538STM(Estero Pencon, Estero Percan, Estero Percán)(CL)
  Estero Carinancagua3896656STM(Estero Carinancagua, Estero Cormancagua)
  Estero Trovoltrovolco3869027STM
  Estero Pichi3876312STM
  Estero El AguilaEstero El Águila3892042STM
  Estero Negro3878811STM
  Estero NirrecoEstero Ñirreco3878596STM(Estero Chilpeco, Estero Mirreco, Estero Nireco, Estero Nirreco, Estero Ñireco, Estero Ñirreco)
  Estero Pehuenco3876876STM
  Estero Caracol3896795STM
  Estero Esquilluco3889778STM
  Estero Radalco3873865STM
  Estero Nihuinco3878656STM
  Estero Ranquilco3873732STM
  Rio ChanquinRío Chanquin3895451STM(Estero Chanquin, Rio Chanquin, Río Chanquin)
  Estero Chilco3895127STM
  Estero Pillunmamilco3875972STM
  Estero Illinco3887341STM
  Estero Bancocura3898856STM
  Estero Macha3881108STM
  Estero Pillahuenco3875992STM(Estero Pellahuenco, Estero Pillahuenco)
  Estero Colliguanqui3894198STM(Estero Coliguanqui, Estero Colliguanqui, Estero Collihuanqui)
  Estero NerecoEstero Ñereco3878595STM(Estero Nereco, Estero Nirca, Estero Ñereco, Estero Ñirca)
  Estero Cucao3893184STM(Estero Coral, Estero Cucao)(CL)
  Estero Challacura3895612STM
  Estero Poipoico3875548STM
  Estero Bulluco3897725STM(Estero Balluco, Estero Bulluco)
  Estero Blanco3898240STM
  Estero Maitenco3880934STM
  Estero Rarirruca3873685STM
  Estero CajonEstero Cajón3897393STM
  Rio MontiglioRío Montiglio3879415STM
  Estero Santa Ana3871670STM
  Estero Ellallicura3891196STM
  Rio DilloRío Dillo3892431STM
  Estero Ononoco3878059STM
  Estero Curilahue3892863STM
  Rio CayulafquenRío Cayulafquen3896062STM
  Rio LumacoRío Lumaco3881171STM
  Estero Ononoco3878058STM
  Estero Madilhue3881054STM
  Estero Colorado3894052STM
  Estero Vallerenco3868628STM
  Rio NegroRío Negro3878783STM
  Estero Meco3880244STM
  Rio NaranjoRío Naranjo3879019STM
  Rio PellahuenRío Pellahuén3876755STM
  Rio IndioRío Indio3887248STM
  Estero Allinco3900072STM
  Estero Collanco3894213STM(Arroyo Coyanco, Estero Collanco, Estero Coyanco)
  Estero NancoEstero Ñanco3879053STM
  Estero Manito3880697STM
  Estero Nielol3878674STM
  Rio CayuncoRío Cayunco3896057STM
  Estero Manzanillo3880631STM(Estero Manzanillo, Rio Coloradito, Río Coloradito)
  Estero Pitraco3875756STM
  Estero Lefuco3883437STM
  Estero Vergara3868392STM
  Estero QuinacoEstero Quiñaco3874059STM
  Rio LolenRío Lolén3882664STM
  Estero del Salto3872507STM(El Salto, Estero del Salto)
  Estero Boyacura3897983STM(Estero Bolacura, Estero Boyacura)
  Rio AgrioRío Agrio3900624STM(Rio Agrio, Rio El Agrio, Río Agrio, Río El Agrio)
  Estero Chumil3894729STM
  Rio El CaracolRío El Caracol3891760STM
  Estero Collico3894200STM
  Estero Pelhuenco3876774STM(Estero Blanco, Estero Pelhuenco)
  Estero Monlu3879508STM
  Estero CollicuraEstero Collícura3894199STM
  Estero Coihueco3894395STM
  Estero ChacaraconEstero Chacaracón3895770STM(Estero Chacanacon, Estero Chacanacón, Estero Chacaracon, Estero Chacaracón, Estero Chacayracon)
  Estero Ventrenco3868459STM
  Estero Antucol3899521STM
  Estero Coyanco3893322STM
  Estero San Francisco3872214STM
  Rio QuillenRío Quillén3874128STM
  Estero Temuco3870009STM
  Estero Agua Santa3900442STM
  Rio BlancoRío Blanco3898209STM
  Estero Huimpil3887511STM
  Estero Antaro3899554STM
  Estero El ViolenEstero El Violén3890175STM
  Rio MitranquenRío Mitranquén3879670STM(Rio Mitranque, Rio Mitranquen, Rio del Ancho, Río Mitranque, Río Mitranquén, Río del Ancho)
  Estero Nilpe3878639STM(Arroyo Nilpe, Estero Nilpe)
  Rio MucoRío Muco3879233STM
  Estero Cohueco3894432STM
  Estero Chequellame3895246STM
  Estero Bolleco3898118STM
  Estero Coihueco3894394STM(Estero Cohueco, Estero Coihueco)
  Estero Molpichagua3879545STM
  Estero Butaco3897671STM
  Rio PedregosoRío Pedregoso3876901STM
  Estero Curaco3892925STM
  Estero Llinco3882881STM(Estero Collinco, Estero Llinco)
  Rio PauleRío Paule3876962STM
  Rio PacuntoRío Pacunto3877801STM(Estero Pancunto, Rio Pacunto, Rio Pacunto Pedregoso, Río Pacunto, Río Pacunto Pedregoso)
  Rio Punta NegraRío Punta Negra3874725STM
  Estero Llallicura3883024STM
  Rio NegroRío Negro3878782STM
  Estero Fiero3889523STM(Estero Fiero, Estero Fierro)
  Estero Coihueco3894393STM(Estero Callimuco, Estero Coihueco, Estero Collimuco)
  Estero Los Ramos3881434STM
  Estero Queule3874317STM
  Estero NircaEstero Ñirca3878605STM(Estero Nereco, Estero Nirca, Estero Ñereco, Estero Ñirca)(CL)
  Estero Aychuco3899076STM
  Rio PitracoRío Pitraco3875754STM
  Rio Pino SoloRío Pino Solo3875901STM
  Estero Longlong3882553STM
  Rio GualyepulliRío Gualyepulli3888519STM(Rio Gualyepulli, Rio Guaye, Rio Huelvepulli, Río Gualyepulli, Río Guaye, Río Huelvepulli)
  Estero Malalche3880879STM
  Rio CollinsRío Collins3894180STM(Rio Callin, Rio Collin, Rio Collins, Río Callin, Río Collin, Río Collins)
  Estero Rumalhue3872701STM
  Estero Las Minas3884162STM
  Estero Rapa3873726STM
  Rio ColoradoRío Colorado3894028STM
  Estero Peupeu3876362STM
  Estero Nalcadero3879078STM
  Rio Pichi PehuencoRío Pichi Pehuenco3876230STM
  Estero Puentes3875015STM
  Estero RanquilEstero Ránquil3873739STM(Arroyo Danguil, Estero Danguil, Estero Ranquil, Estero Ránquil)
  Estero CollimallinEstero Collimallín3894186STM
  Estero Coihueco3894392STM
  Estero Deille3892691STM
  Estero Alhueco3900109STM
  Estero Pichi TralihueEstero Pichi Tralihué3876220STM
  Estero del Trueno3869017STM(Estero El Trueno, Estero del Trueno)
  Estero Collihueco3894190STM(Estero Colihueco, Estero Collihueco)
  Estero Rumulhue3872693STM
  Estero Porfiado3875438STM
  Estero Pichi-CautinEstero Pichi-Cautín3876300STM
  Estero El Tambor3890321STM
  Estero Centinela3895966STM
  Rio RenacoRío Renaco3873460STM
  Rio DollincoRío Dollinco3892326STM(Estero Dollinco, Rio Dollinco, Río Dollinco)
  Rio MucoRío Muco3879232STM
  Estero Quilacura3874264STM
  Rio TralihueRío Tralihué3869352STM
  Rio Pino SoloRío Pino Solo3875900STM
  Estero Curaco3892924STM
  Estero Tinvuel3869785STM
  Estero Buchoco3897852STM
  Estero Huelqueco3887697STM(Estero Huelqueco, Huelquenco)
  Estero Chanco3895485STM
  Estero Quiripio3873955STM
  Estero Chapuel3895408STM(Estero Chagual, Estero Chapuel)
  Rio PehuencoRío Pehuenco3876873STM(Rio Pehueco, Rio Pehuenco, Río Pehueco, Río Pehuenco)
  Estero Bolleco3898117STM(Estero Bolleco, Estero Boyeco)
  Estero Cochicahuin3894495STM(Estero Cachicahuin, Estero Cochicahuin)
  Rio LiucuraRío Liucura3883061STM
  Estero El Peral3890732STM
  Estero Intermitente3887157STM
  Estero Pispico3875779STM
  Estero RucanancoEstero Rucañanco3872740STM
  Estero Burime3897705STM
  Estero Santa Celia3871633STM
  Estero Hunaco3887442STM(Estero Humaco, Estero Hunaco)
  Estero Quintrilpe3873973STM
  Estero El Saltillo3890451STM
  Estero Agua Enterrada3900490STM(Estero Agua Enterrada, Estero Agua Enterradas)
  Estero de Pino Hachado3875907STM
  Estero Cunco3892979STM
  Rio QuinquenRío Quinquén3874010STM
  Estero Curileufu3892859STM(Estero Curileo, Estero Curileu, Estero Curileufu)
  Rio SanuecoRío Sanueco3871297STM
  Estero Trabunco3869398STM
  Rio VilcunRío Vilcún3868205STM
  Estero Lanlan3885216STM
  Estero Curaco3892923STM
  Estero Chanco3895484STM
  Estero Paulul3876956STM
  Estero Llamuco3883003STM
  Estero Hunaco3887441STM
  Estero Codihue3894458STM
  Estero Curaco3892922STM
  Estero Pillo-MallinEstero Pillo-Mallín3875979STM
  Estero Millinco3879865STM
  Estero Pumalal3874847STM
  Estero Pusulhuin3874572STM
  Rio TrufquennilahueRío Trufquennilahue3869016STM
  Rio CalbucoRío Calbuco3897330STM
  Estero Coilaco3894380STM
  Estero Coilico3894377STM(Estero Coilico, Rio Collinco, Río Collinco)
  Estero Quelihue3874426STM(Estero Molluco, Estero Quelihue)
  Estero Butaco3897670STM
  Estero Tromen3869055STM
  Rio Las DamasRío Las Damas3884393STM(Rio Damas, Rio Las Damas, Río Damas, Río Las Damas)
  Estero Pichilleuque3876249STM
  Estero Champulle3895581STM
  Estero Pitraco3875755STM
  Rio TuetueRío Tuetué3868967STM
  Estero Neculqueo3878963STM
  Estero Cailaco3897420STM
  Estero Lolcura3882668STM
  Pichi Temuco3876221STM(Estero Curaco, Pichi Temuco)
  Estero Colico3894274STM
  Rio ChanchucoRío Chanchuco3895496STM
  Rio RucanucoRío Rucañuco3872738STM
  Estero OnoicoEstero Oñoico3878061STM(Estero Ono, Estero Onoico, Estero Oño, Estero Oñoico)
  Estero Coihueco3894391STM
  Estero Temuco3870008STM
  Estero Curaco3892921STM
  Estero OnoicoEstero Oñoico3878062STM(Estero Onoico, Estero Onolco, Estero Oñoico, Estero Oñolco)
  Estero Truftruf3869015STM
  Estero Trentren3869239STM
  Estero Traitraico3869358STM
  Estero Llancahue3882993STM
  Estero Curichapa3892873STM
  Rio CollincoRío Collinco3894183STM(Estero Collinco, Rio Collinco, Río Collinco)(CL)
  Rio SollincoRío Sollinco3870691STM
  Estero Quillen3874132STM
  Estero Yadquihue3867778STM
  Estero Molluco3879549STM
  Rio Agua EnterradaRío Agua Enterrada3900489STM
  Estero Pichico3876293STM
  Estero ManioEstero Mañío3880701STM(Estero Manio, Estero Mañío, Rio Manio, Río Mañio)
  Estero Batuco3898589STM
  Estero Tranoi3869323STM
  Estero Lleupeco3882907STM
  Estero Los Lleuques3881912STM
  Rio CodihueRío Codihue3894457STM(Rio Codihue, Rio Codinhue, Río Codihue, Río Codinhue)
  Rio MonculRío Moncul3879526STM
  Estero Botrolhue3897993STM(Estero Bolsolhue, Estero Botrolhue)
  Estero Poguilcha3875551STM
  Rio QueteleufuRío Queteleufu3874338STM
  Estero Hurcaco3887432STM(Estero Huircaco, Estero Hurcaco)
  Rio RilpeRío Rilpe3873300STM
  Estero Ralipitra3873834STM
  Estero Huilchico3887556STM
  Rio MatusRío Matus3880323STM
  Rio QuetraleufuRío Quetraleufu3874332STM
  Estero Camare3897187STM(Estero Camare, Estero Camore)
  Rio CoyanRío Coyán3893330STM(Estero C. de Indio, Rio Coyan, Río Coyán)
  Rio LoncovacaRío Loncovaca3882570STM(Rio Loncovaca, Rio Loncoyan, Río Loncovaca, Río Loncoyán)
  Estero Entuco3890029STM
  Estero Andimuen3899667STM
  Estero Perquite3876471STM
  Estero LidicoEstero Lídico3883253STM(Estero Lidico, Estero Lídico, Quebrada Lidico)
  Estero Cancura3896973STM
  Estero PataconEstero Patacón3877037STM
  Rio ImperialRío Imperial3887315STM(Rio Imperial, Río Imperial)
 Rio CholcholRío Cholchol3894893STM
  Estero Lumaco3881178STM(Estero Lumaco, Rio Lumaco, Río Lumaco)
  Rio PurenRío Purén3874609STM
  Rio ColpiRío Colpi3894006STM(Rio Colpi, Rio Panqueco, Rio Panquenco, Río Colpi, Río Panqueco, Río Panquenco)
  Rio TraiguenRío Traiguén3869369STM
  Rio QuinoRío Quino3874015STM
 Rio QuillenRío Quillén3874129STM
  Rio CautinRío Cautín3896094STM(Cauten, Rio Cautin, Río Cautín)
  Rio QuepeRío Quepe3874364STM
  Rio HuichahueRío Huichahue3887567STM
 Muco River
  Rio CallinRío Callín3897230STM(Rio Callin, Rio Collin, Río Callín, Río Collin)
  Rio BlancoRío Blanco (Caburga)3898210STM
  Estero Curilebu3892861STM
  Estero Laja3885569STM
  Estero Boroa3898024STM
  Estero Llicoca3882892STM
  Estero Cudico3893159STM(Estero Codico, Estero Cudico)
  Estero Pulol3874863STM
  Estero Rapa3873725STM
  Estero Llancao3882989STM
  Estero Huillinco3887534STM
  Estero Chapille3895428STM
  Estero Collahue3894217STM
  Estero Puello3875034STM
  Estero PaifuEstero Paifú3877771STM
  Estero Molco3879630STM
  Estero Bollilco3898113STM
  Estero Metrenco3879959STM
  Rio BudiRío Budi3897841STM
  Estero FinfinEstero Finfín3889494STM
  Estero Budi Chico3897840STM
  Estero TraiguenEstero Traiguén3869375STM
  Estero Cunco3892978STM
  Rio CantucoRío Cantuco3896865STM
  Estero Chapod3895410STM
  Estero Llamaico3883021STM
  Estero Huilquilco3887513STM
  Estero Pelal3876806STM(Estero El Peral, Estero Pelal)
  Estero Chucauco3894790STM
  Estero Huichahue3887568STM(Estero Huichahue, Quebrada El Tonco)
  Estero Curacalpu3892937STM
  Estero Yuco3867632STM
  Estero Los Canelos3882282STM(Estero Canelos, Estero El Canelo, Estero Los Canelos)
  Rio ZahuelhueRío Zahuelhue3867586STM
  Estero Chufquenpalemo3894762STM
  Rio AlpehueRío Alpehue3900014STM(Rio Alpahue, Rio Alpehue, Río Alpahue, Río Alpehue)
  Estero ColtueEstero Coltúe3893994STM
  Rio TacuraRío Tacura3870348STM
  Estero Membrillo3880069STM
  Estero Malalcha3880880STM
  Estero Lliuco3882875STM
  Estero El Salto3890432STM
  Estero Canelos3896930STM
  Rio PeucoRío Peuco3876389STM
  Rio GuallerupeRío Guallerupe3888532STM(Rio Alpehue, Rio Guallerupe, Río Alpehue, Río Guallerupe)
  Estero El Manzano3891075STM(Estero El Manzano, Estero El Manzanol, Rio del Manzano, Río del Manzano)
  Rio MalalcahuelloRío Malalcahuello3880881STM
  Rio CurilafquenRío Curilafquén3892864STM
  Estero Collileufu3894188STM
  Estero Pillanco3875988STM
  Estero Llallehue3883026STM(Estero Llahuelle, Estero Llallehue)
  Estero Quilinco3874200STM
  Estero Quenuco3874372STM
  Estero Folilco3889415STM
  Rio CaihuicoRío Caihuico3897422STM
  Estero Cumbli3893010STM
  Rio TumuntucoRío Tumuntuco3868932STM
  Rio CarenRío Carén3896670STM
  Estero Chucaco3894793STM
  Rio LlaimaRío Llaima3883031STM
  Estero Tabal3870396STM
  Estero Matrilhue3880326STM
  Estero Comoe3893950STM
  Estero HuechulepanEstero Huechulepán3887739STM
  Estero Bollico3898114STM(Estero Bollico, Estero Bollilco)
  Estero Coihue3894419STM(Estero Coihue, Quebrada Coihue)
  Estero Picuche3876186STM
  Rio MalulcoRío Malulco3880793STM
  Estero Cunco3892977STM
  Rio CuracalpuRío Curacalpu3892936STM
  Estero Tapelco3870146STM
  Estero Nahuelcura3879090STM(Estero Nahuelcura, Rio Nahulcura, Rio Nahulcuro, Río Nahulcura)
  Estero AllipenEstero Allipén3900066STM
  Estero Alinilahue3900087STM
  Rio NegroRío Negro3878781STM
  Estero Budi3897843STM
  Estero Malalhue3880872STM
  Estero Tugo3868965STM
  Estero Pipilos3875852STM
  Estero Ineique3887237STM
  Estero Rehuelhue3873538STM
  Estero Epuralal3890018STM
  Estero Quechereguas3874466STM(Estero Loncoche, Estero Quechereguas)
  Estero Huilio3887547STM
  Estero Lluco3882836STM
  Estero Dollinco3892330STM
  Estero Curipel3892843STM
  Estero El UnicoEstero El Único3890199STM
  Estero Hullinco3887462STM
  Estero Barranco3898722STM
  Estero Barrozo3898636STM
  Estero Dichas3892471STM(Estero Dichas, Estero Ineihoc)
  Estero LolenEstero Lolén3882665STM
  Estero Trumpulo3869006STM
  Estero Neicuf3878752STM
  Estero Choroico3894857STM
  Rio LonglongRío Longlong3882552STM(Rio Longlona, Rio Longlong, Río Longlona, Río Longlong)
  Estero Llollelhue3882856STM
  Estero Filcun3889509STM(Estero Eilcun, Estero Filcun)
  Estero Allinco3900071STM
  Estero HuepollenEstero Huepollén3887634STM(Estero Huepollen, Estero Huepollén, Estero Huepoltue)
  Estero Chanco3895483STM
  Rio QuinqueRío Quinque3874013STM
  Estero PucolonEstero Pucolón3875072STM
  Estero Chelle3895278STM(Estero Chelle, Rio Chelle, Río Chelle)
  Rio TrailanquiRío Tráilanqui3869365STM
  Estero Chada3895697STM
  Estero Curaco3892920STM
  Rio ColicoRío Colico3894272STM
  Estero Malalhue3880871STM
  Estero Cunco3892976STM
  Rio CoipueRío Coipué3894350STM
  Estero Viloco3868138STM
  Estero Comul3893940STM
  Estero Chailef3895648STM(Estero Chailef, Estero Chuilef)
  Estero Dollerepu3892335STM(Estero Dellerrepu, Estero Dollerepu)
  Estero LinecoEstero Liñeco3883140STM
  Estero Troquen3869031STM
  Estero Sallipulli3872522STM
  Rio RucacuraRío Rucacura3872745STM
  Estero Pichico3876292STM
  Estero Curinumo3892847STM
  Estero Coihueco3894390STM
  Estero Guisno3888254STM
  Estero Barranco3898721STM
  Rio YenellenchicoRío Yenellenchico3867685STM
  Estero Quitrahue3873906STM(Estero Puyehue, Estero Quitrahue)
  Rio LlihuinRío Llihuin3882886STM(Rio Llihuin, Rio Llinhuin, Río Llihuin, Río Llinhuin)
  Estero Ulmos3868832STM
  Estero Lindero3883153STM
  Estero Petrenco3876412STM
  Estero Quema3874410STM
  Rio LlocoRío Lloco3882865STM
  Estero Pulul3874854STM
  Estero Checat3895312STM(Estero Checat, Estero Checot)
  Estero Totoral3869436STM
  Estero Pidenco3876171STM
  Estero Sepulco3871010STM
  Rio PedregosoRío Pedregoso3876900STM
  Estero Lumaco3881177STM(Estero Iumaco, Estero Lumaco)
  Rio VoipireRío Voipire3867980STM
  Rio QuinenahuinRío Quiñenahuín3874023STM
  Rio TraileufuRío Traileufu3869363STM
  Rio QuilenoRío Quileno3874222STM
  Rio QuelhueRío Quelhue3874428STM
  Rio PuconRío Pucón3875069STM(Rio Minetue, Rio Pucon, Río Minetué, Río Pucón)
  Rio CarrileufuRío Carrileufú3896513STM
  Estero ManioEstero Mañío3880700STM
  Rio ToltenRío Toltén3869671STM
  Rio MahuidancheRío Mahuidanche3881012STM(Rio Mahuidan, Rio Mahuidanche, Rio Mahuidanchi, Río Mahuidanche, Río Mahuidanchi)
  Rio DonguilRío Donguil3892274STM(Dongul?)
  Estero Puyehue3874534STM
  Rio AllipenRío Allipén3900065STM
  Rio CuracoRío Curaco3892915STM
  Rio TrufultrufulRío Trufultruful3869013STM
  Rio TrancuraRío Trancura3869327STM
  Rio LiucuraRío Liucura3883060STM
  Estero QuinquichanEstero Quinquichán3874009STM
  Estero Collaco3894225STM
  Rio ClaroRío Claro3894565STM
  Estero Lliulliu3882870STM
  Rio PucayanRío Pucayán3875094STM
  Estero Pilico3876001STM
  Rio HuiscapiRío Huiscapi3887477STM(Rio Huiscape, Rio Huiscapi, Río Huiscape, Río Huiscapi)
  Estero Chircos3894972STM(Estero Chircos, Rio Chircos, Río Chircos)
  Rio CurimenoRío Curimeno3892855STM
  Rio LahuencoRío Lahuenco3885633STM
  Estero Tungui3868917STM
  Estero Cumin3893000STM
  Rio CuicoRío Cuico3893086STM
  Estero PichilefenEstero Pichilefén3876258STM
  Rio LlefuenRío Llefuén3882919STM(Estero Lefuen, Rio Llefuen, Río Llefuén)
  Rio GrandeRío Grande3888776STM
  Rio TurbioRío Turbio3868885STM
  Estero Llaullau3882928STM(Estero Llaullau, Rio Llaullau, Río Llaullau)
  Estero CarrileufuEstero Carrileufú3896514STM
  Rio LlafencoRío Llafenco3883048STM
  Rio CavisaniRío Cavisañi3896078STM
  Ri HuirinlilRí Huirinlil3887480STM(Ri Huirinlil, Rio Huirintil, Rí Huirinlil, Río Huirintil)
  Rio MaichinRío Maichín3881006STM
  Rio IlecuraRío Ilecura3887350STM
  Estero Niguen3878662STM
  Estero Luma3881183STM
  Rio MailencoRío Mailenco3881000STM
  Rio CopihuelpiRío Copihuelpi3893649STM
  Estero Cahuinhue3897440STM
  Estero Loncovilo3882569STM
  Estero Antuco3899523STM
  Rio QueuleRío Queule3874316STM
  Estero PirenEstero Pirén3875816STM
  Estero Coihue3894418STM
  Estero Mulul3879188STM
  Rio LiumallaRío Liumalla3883058STM(Rio Liumalla, Rio Lumalla, Río Liumalla, Río Lumalla)
  Estero Runcahue3872692STM
  Rio LeufucadeRío Leufucade3883301STM(Rio Leufucade, Rio de Levufucade, Río Leufucade)
  Rio EpucuraRío Epucura3890021STM
  Estero Chalipen3895619STM
  Rio AntilhueRío Antilhue3899544STM(Rio Antilhu, Rio Antilhue, Río Antilhu, Río Antilhue)
  Rio PuescoRío Puesco3874923STM
  Rio ChaingalRío Chaingal3895646STM
  Estero Dollinco3892329STM
  Rio MomollucoRío Momolluco3879539STM(Rio Momo Iluco, Rio Momolluco, Río Momo Iluco, Río Momolluco)
  Estero Melisque3880102STM
  Rio TrailefquenRío Trailefquén3869364STM
  Rio YihuechozoyRío Yihuechozoy3867647STM
  Rio LlancahueRío Llancahue3882990STM
  Estero Nalalhuaca3879079STM
  Rio TaitayRío Taitay3870314STM
  Rio GuanehueRío Guanehue3888439STM(Rio Guanehue, Rio Huanehue, Río Guanehue, Río Huanehue)
  Rio MalihueRío Malihue3880856STM(Estero Malihue, Rio Malihue, Río Malihue)

See also
 List of lakes in Chile
 List of volcanoes in Chile
 List of islands of Chile
 List of fjords, channels, sounds and straits of Chile
 List of lighthouses in Chile

Notes

References

External links
 Rivers of Chile
 Base de Datos Hidrográfica de Chile
 

Araucania